Offering may refer to:

In religion
 A religious offering or sacrifice 
 Alms, voluntary gifts to others, especially poor people, as an act of virtue
 Tithe, the tenth part of something, such as income, paid to a religious organization or government
 Offertory, the part of a worship service where gifts are given
 Sacred food as offering
 Votive offering
 Burnt offering

Buddhism
 Offering (Buddhism)
 Sur offering

Judaism
General article:  Korban
 Dough offering
 Drink offering
 Gift offering
 Guilt offering
 Heave offering
 Incense offering
 Sin offering
 Slaughter offering
 Thank offering
 Thanksgiving offering
 Wave offering

Christianity
 Offering (Christianity)

Roman Catholicism
 Morning offering

Church of Jesus Christ of Latter-day Saints
 Fast offering

Finance and business
 Alternative public offering, an alternative to an initial public offering
 Direct public offering, a method by which a business can offer stock directly to the public
 Follow-on offering, an issuance of stock after the company's initial public offering
 Initial public offering, a public offering for the first time
 Public offering, the offering of securities of a company to the public
 Public offering without listing, a public offering by non-Japanese firms in the Japanese market
 Seasoned equity offering, a new equity issue by an already publicly traded company
 Secondary market offering, an offering of a security that has been previously issued
 Securities offering, a round of investment, by which a business raises money

Arts and entertainment

Film
The Offering (1966 film), a Canadian drama film directed by David Secter
The Offering (2004 film), an Australian film of 2004
The Offering (2016 film), or The Faith of Anna Waters, an American-Singaporean horror film

Literature
The Offering, a 1975 play by Nuruddin Farah
The Offering, a 2015 novel by Grace McCleen
The Offering, a 1982 novel by Gerald Suster

Music

Albums
 Offering (Axe album), 1982
 Offering (Carpenters album), reissued as Ticket to Ride, 1969
 Offering (Cults album) or the title song, 2017
 Offering (Larry Coryell album) or the title song, 1972
Offering: Live at Temple University, by John Coltrane, or the title song (see below), 2014 (recorded in 1966)
 Offering, an album by Merzbow (Masami Akita), 2004
 The Offering (Killah Priest album) or the title song, 2007
 The Offering (Larry Willis album) or the title song, 2008
 The Offering, by Mary Youngblood, 1998

Songs
 "Offering", by Chelsea Wolfe from Hiss Spun, 2017
 "Offering", by John Coltrane from Expression, 1967
 "An Offering", by Neurosis from Sovereign, 2000
 "The Offering", by Donna de Lory from The Unchanging, 2013

Painting
The Offering, a 1971 painting by Ray Crooke

See also 
 Offer (disambiguation)
 Offerings (disambiguation)

ko:제물
ja:供物
zh:祭品